Mary Byrd may refer to:

 Mary E. Byrd (1849–1934), American educator
 Mary Willing Byrd (1740–1814), second wife of Colonel William Byrd III